Swing You Sinners! is a 1930 animated cartoon short, directed by the Fleischer Brothers as part of the Talkartoons series. The cartoon is notable for its surreal, dark, and abstract content.

Plot
Bimbo is seen late at night, trying to steal a chicken. After several attempts, he accidentally grabs a policeman by the hand. As he tries to walk away as if nothing happened the chicken follows him in spite of this, as does the policeman.

Eventually, the chicken and its chicks flee, while Bimbo enters a cemetery. To his fear, he finds out that the place is haunted, complete with a host of ghosts and other supernatural beings who tell him that he will be punished for his sin regardless of him begging for mercy and assurance that he has made efforts to become a better person. Throughout the rest of the film, Bimbo is reprimanded and pursued by them until he enters a large cave, whereupon the monsters sing about Bimbo's demise, and a huge skull devours him, ending the cartoon.

Background
The cartoon was released on September 24, 1930 in the Talkartoons series and animated by Ted Sears and Willard Bowsky. George Cannata, Shamus Culhane, Al Eugster, William Henning, Seymour Kneitel and Grim Natwick also worked on it, but are uncredited in the title card. The cartoon was animated by a completely new staff who had never worked in animation before, because the studio had to replace some animators who quit. Animator Shamus Culhane states in his memoirs that though he created and animated what might be construed a racist caricature of "a Jew with a black beard, huge nose, and a derby," the studio's atmosphere and its mixed ethnic crew made the depiction completely acceptable to all the Jews in the studio. The caricature in question is a reference to Jewish-American comedian Monroe Silver.

Reception
Motion Picture News wrote on October 11, 1930, "The clever cartoon pen of Max Fleischer again demonstrates itself in this Talkartoon. An off-stage chorus sings the lyrics to the rhythm of the action and the result is usually diverting. The cartoon hero is this time taken into a grave-yard with the absurd results that you might well imagine. Worth a watch."

Music
The soundtrack was composed by W. Franke Harling, with lyrics by Sam Coslow. The title song was based on “Sing, You Sinners!”, some of which is played in the titles of the cartoon.

Legacy
John Kricfalusi named it one of his favorite cartoons and played during a retrospective of his personal favorite animated shorts. He also compared it to Walt Disney's The Skeleton Dance (which was also set on a cemetery) and felt Swing You Sinners was superior.

In 2012 Cracked hosted an article describing "5 Old Children's Cartoons Way Darker Than Most Horror Movies" and listed Swing You Sinners at No. 1.

In 2014, LA-based indie band Caught A Ghost released a music video to their track "Time Go" which consisted entirely of footage from "Swing You Sinners".

Serbian alternative rock band Brigand named their debut album Zaplešimo Grešnici (literally "swing you sinners" in Serbian) after the cartoon.

Video game developers Chad and Jared Moldenhauer based the atmosphere of their game Cuphead on several Fleischer cartoons, including "Swing You Sinners". Chad Moldenhauer called Fleischer Studios "the magnetic north of his art style". Kill Screen described Max Fleischer's studio (run with his two brothers) as having "transportive, transformative, and massively f**ked up" short films, such as "Swing You Sinners!". The in-game achievement for defeating the game's final boss is even named "Swing You Sinner". Additionally, boss Cagney Carnation's idle animation resembles the hand dance done by one of the ghosts in the cartoon.

References

External links
IMDB page

1930s English-language films
1930s ghost films
1930s American animated films
1930 animated films
1930 short films
1930s animated short films
American black-and-white films
Short films directed by Dave Fleischer
Fleischer Studios short films
Paramount Pictures short films
Films set in cemeteries
Films set in hell
American animated short films
Animated films about dogs
American ghost films